The Men's sabre event of the 2014 World Fencing Championships was held on 18 July 2014. The qualification was held on 15 July 2014.

Medalists

Draw

Finals

Top half

Section 1

Section 2

Bottom half

Section 3

Section 4

Final classification

References
 Bracket
 Final classification

2014 World Fencing Championships